Jane Pilcher SFHEA is a sociologist specialising in names and naming, gender, and ageing. She is an associate lecturer at Nottingham Trent University, having previously held posts at Cardiff University and the University of Leicester.

Education
Pilcher has a PhD (1992) from Cardiff University; her thesis title was "Social change and feminism: three generations of women, feminist issues and the women's movement".

Career
After research at Cardiff, Pilcher worked at the University of Leicester as a lecturer and later an associate professor. In 2019 she moved to Nottingham Trent University as associate professor of sociology.

Her 2004 book Fifty key concepts in gender studies, co-authored with  Imelda Whelehan was published in a second edition as Key concepts in gender studies (2016,) with the addition of nine further concepts.

Her work has led to several appearances in the media including discussion of children and fashion on BBC Radio 4's Woman's Hour in 2011 and of names on  Thinking Allowed in 2016 and Woman's Hour in 2017.

In 2015, she became a Senior Fellow of the Higher Education Academy.

Selected publications

References

External links

Personal website

Year of birth missing (living people)
Living people
British sociologists
British women sociologists
Gender studies academics
Onomastics
Academics of Nottingham Trent University
Academics of the University of Leicester
Academics of Cardiff University